Albert Edward Langford (16 October 1899–1965) was an English footballer who played in the Football League for Charlton Athletic, Merthyr Town, Swansea Town and Walsall.

References

1899 births
1965 deaths
English footballers
Association football defenders
English Football League players
Merthyr Town F.C. players
Swansea City A.F.C. players
Worcester City F.C. players
Charlton Athletic F.C. players
Walsall F.C. players
Dudley Town F.C. players